The Corradino prison, officially known as the Corradino Correctional Facility is a prison located in Paola, Malta. It is Malta’s largest and main correctional facility; hosting different sections for males, females, and children. The prison takes its name from the hill of Corradino, named after Conradin of Swabia, king of Sicily who in the 13th century also dominated the Maltese archipelago. It is located 5 km from the capital Valletta.

History 

The prison of Corradino was built by the British colonial authorities starting from 1842 based on plans by W. Lamb Arrowsmith on the model of the Pentonville prison in London, with a capacity of 200 prisoners divided into 4 wings.

On November 28, 1942, the irredentist Carmelo Borg Pisani was executed by hanging in the prison for treason and conspiracy against His Majesty's government. This was also the last of the 18 executions carried out in Malta.

Conditions and inmates
In 1995 the association of prisoners Mid-Dlam ghad-Dawl ("From darkness to light") was established  to improve living conditions inside the prison, the association is affiliated with the Action for Prisoners' Families of England and Wales (APF) and the European Group of Prisoners' Abroad (EGPA) and is also part of the Association of Prison Volunteers. In 1999 the juvenile wing was built with 36 cells Since 2005 the prison hosts the only Maltese serial killer, Silvio Mangion sentenced to life imprisonment in 2010. On 28 January 2006 the prison was visited by the new bishop of Gozo Mario Grech. In 2011 there were 593 prisoners out of 444 places available and they were divided as follows: 384 prisoners already convicted (including 24 women); 209 prisoners awaiting trial (including 15 women); and 34 underage boys (16-22).

In 2011 the percentage of juvenile detainees (6.1%) was the highest among those in the countries belonging to the European Union. In 2014, 205 people worked in the prison including 18 policemen from the Malta Police Force. In 2013 it housed 576 prisoners.

See also 
 Paola

References

External links 
  Mid-Dlam ghad-Daw "Dall'oscurità alla luce", associazione di detenuti
  Corradino Correctional Facility sul sito del ministero degli affari interni
  Correctional Services in Malta sul sito del governo maltese
  Exclusive visit to Malta's Prison, immagini del carcere
  Corradino Correctional Facilities - 22.02.2010, vista aerea del carcere

Paola, Malta
Prisons in Malta